The Dixie class destroyer tender was a class of five United States Navy destroyer tenders used during World War II. The basic hull and superstructure for this class was the same as the Fulton-class submarine tenders and Vulcan-class repair ships.

Towards the end of World War II, a modified Dixie-class destroyer tender was planned, the New England class.<ref>Stefan Terzibaschitsch: 70 Jahre Flottenhilfsschiffe der U.S. Navy. Leonberg, Germany, p. 23 and p. 144</ref> New England'' was laid down on 1 October 1944 by the Tampa Shipbuilding Company, Inc., at Tampa, but the ships construction was cancelled on 12 August 1945.

Ships

References

External links
 NavSource Online: Service Ship Photo Archive - AD-14 Dixie

Notes

 
 Dixie class destroyer tender
 Dixie class destroyer tender
 Dixie class destroyer tender
Auxiliary depot ship classes